Epidermis may refer to:
 Epidermis (botany), the outermost cell layer of plants
 Epidermis (skin), the outermost layer of the skin of a human or other vertebrate animal
 Epidermis (zoology), the sheet of cells that covers the body of all animals more complex than sponges